Ally Brazil (born 10 December 1958) is a Scottish former footballer, who played over 200 league games for Hibernian. He played in all three games of the marathon 1979 Scottish Cup Final, which Hibs lost in extra time of the second replay. He later went on to work as a bus driver for Lothian Buses.

His son, Alan Brazil, played for Arbroath, Stenhousemuir and Berwick Rangers as a striker.

References

External links

1958 births
Association football defenders
Forfar Athletic F.C. players
Hamilton Academical F.C. players
Hibernian F.C. players
Living people
Scottish Football League players
Scottish footballers
Footballers from Edinburgh
Scotland under-21 international footballers